Lobogenesis is a genus of moths belonging to the subfamily Tortricinae of the family Tortricidae.

Species
Lobogenesis antiqua Brown, 2000
Lobogenesis banosia Razowski, 2005
Lobogenesis calamistrana Razowski, 2005
Lobogenesis centrota (Razowski, 1997)
Lobogenesis contrasta Brown, 2000
Lobogenesis corymbovalva Razowski, 2005
Lobogenesis eretmognathos Razowski, 2005
Lobogenesis inserata Razowski, 2005
Lobogenesis larana Brown, 2000
Lobogenesis lobata Razowski, 1990
Lobogenesis magdalenana Brown, 2000
Lobogenesis pallidcypas Razowski, 2005
Lobogenesis pectinata Razowski, 2005
Lobogenesis penai Brown, 2000
Lobogenesis peruviana Brown, 2000
Lobogenesis phoxapex Razowski, 2005
Lobogenesis polyspina Razowski, 2005
Lobogenesis primitiva Razowski & Wojtusiak, 2009
Lobogenesis riesteri Razowski & Pelz, 2003
Lobogenesis sthernarcosta Razowski, 2005
Lobogenesis trematerrae Razowski & Wojtusiak, 2011
Lobogenesis varnicosa Brown, 2000

See also
List of Tortricidae genera

References

 , 2000: Revision of Lobogenesis Razowski and Odonthalitus Razowski (lepidoptera: Tortricidae: Tortricinae), with comments on their monophyly. Proceedings of the Entomological Society of Washington 102 (1): 21–49.
 , 2005, World Catalogue of Insects 5
 , 1990, Shilap Revista de Lepidopterologia 18: 213
 , 2009: Tortricidae (Lepidoptera) from the mountains of Ecuador and remarks on their geographical distribution. Part IV. Eastern Cordillera. Acta Zoologica Cracoviensia 51B (1-2): 119–187. doi:10.3409/azc.52b_1-2.119-187. Full article: .
 , 2011: Tortricidae (Lepidoptera) from Colombia). Acta Zoologica Cracoviensia 54B (1-2): 103–128. Full article: .

External links
tortricidae.com

Euliini
Tortricidae genera